Goran Smiljanić (born 31 January 1990) is a Serbian footballer who plays for FK Borac Sajkas.

External links
 
 Goran Smiljanić Stats at utakmica.rs
 UEFA profile

1990 births
Living people
Footballers from Novi Sad
Serbian footballers
Association football midfielders
FK Vojvodina players
FK Inđija players
FK Bežanija players
FK Kolubara players
OFK Bačka players
FK Rad players
FK Proleter Novi Sad players
FK Budućnost Dobanovci players
Serbian First League players
Serbian SuperLiga players